The Rejection and the Meaning of the World, known also as World Rejection and Theodicy, is a 1916 essay written by Max Weber, a German economist and sociologist. The original edition was published in German as an essay in the 1916 issues of the Archiv für Sozialwissenschaft und Sozialforschung, and  various translations to English exist.

In this book Weber analyses the unavoidable tensions between religious values and worldly activities.

External links
 Online ebook of World Rejection and Theodicy

Sociology essays
Essays by Max Weber
1916 essays
Theodicy